The qualifiers of the 2023 CONCACAF U-17 Championship took place between 30 August and 8 September 2022.

Draw
The draw for the qualifying round took place on 16 June 2022.

Venues

Qualifying round
The winners of each group qualify for the 2023 CONCACAF U-17 Championship, where they enter the round of 16 of the knockout stage.

Group A

Group B

Group C

Group D

Goalscorers

References

External links
Under 17 – Men, CONCACAF.com

U-17 Championship qualifying
2022
August 2022 sports events in the United States
September 2022 sports events in the United States
2022 Concacaf U-17 Championship qualifying
2022 in sports in Florida
2022 in youth association football